Deep is the third studio album from the jazz rock fusion trio Niacin, released in March 2000.

The album is heavily loaded with Billy Sheehan's powerful bass solos and features contributions from guest musicians Glenn Hughes on vocals and Steve Lukather on guitar.

Track listing

 "Swing Swang Swung" - 3:48
 "Best Laid Plans" - 4:26
 "Sugar Blues" - 5:50
 "Stompin' Ground" - 5:03
 "Blue Mondo" - 5:56
 "Panic Button" - 5:37
 "Bootleg Jeans" - 7:00
 "Mean Streets" - 5:37
 "This One's Called..." - 3:46
 "Klunkified "- 2:58
 "Ratta McQue" - 3:48
 "Things Ain't Like They Used to Be" - 7:25
 "Bluesion" - 4:18

Personnel

Musicians
 Billy Sheehan - bass.
 Dennis Chambers - drums.  
 John Novello - piano, Fender Rhodes, Hammond B-3 organ, synthesizers.

Guest musicians
 Glenn Hughes - vocals.  
 Steve Lukather - guitar.

External links
Deep album at Niacin's official website
Niacin's Deep album at ProgArchives

References 

2000 albums
Niacin (band) albums